Drake Batherson (born April 27, 1998) is an American-born Canadian professional ice hockey right winger currently playing for the Ottawa Senators of the National Hockey League. He was drafted by the Ottawa Senators in the fourth round, 121st overall of the 2017 NHL draft.

Playing career

Junior
Following the 2014–15 season with the Valley Wildcats, Batherson was selected in the sixth round, 97th overall by the Cape Breton Screaming Eagles in the 2015 Quebec Major Junior Hockey League (QMJHL) Entry Draft. Batherson split the 2015–16 season between the Wildcats and Screaming Eagles. Leading into the 2017 NHL Entry Draft, Batherson was ranked 117th among North American skaters by the NHL Central Scouting Services; He was considered undersized and was selected in the fourth round, 121st overall by the Ottawa Senators.

On October 3, 2017, the Senators signed Batherson to a three-year, entry-level contract. He returned to major junior for the 2017–18 season, splitting the year between the Screaming Eagles and the Blainville-Boisbriand Armada. The Armada won the league title as best overall regular season team and went to the playoff final before being defeated by the Acadie-Bathurst Titan. Batherson led the QMJHL in points during the 2018 playoffs, scoring 13 goals and adding 20 assists.

Professional
Batherson began the 2018–19 season with the Senators' American Hockey League (AHL) affiliate, the Belleville Senators. After recording 20 points in 14 games, he was recalled by Ottawa on November 12. Batherson made his NHL debut with the club on November 15. He scored his first career NHL goal (a game-winning goal) on his first shot in a 2–1 win over the Detroit Red Wings. He would record three goals and eight points before being returned to the AHL on December 18.

Batherson found immediate success in the AHL and was later selected to participate in the 2019 AHL All-Star Game, where he scored five goals for the North Division and was named Most Valuable Player. On February 8, 2019, Batherson set a Belleville Senators franchise record for most goals by a rookie in a season when he scored his 12th goal of the season. In 2019–20, Batherson split the season between Belleville and Ottawa. During the 2019–20 AHL season, Batherson was again chosen to participate in the 2020 AHL All-Star Game after leading the league in scoring. During his time in Belleville, Batherson set franchise records for goals, assists and points.

In the 2020–21 NHL season, Batherson made the Ottawa roster out of training camp. In February 2021, Batherson tied the Ottawa Senators' all-time record of scoring goals in six consecutive games.  He finished the season tied for second on the team in goals with 17 goals and fourth in points with 36 in 56 games.

On September 3, 2021, Batherson signed a six-year, $29.85 million contract with the Senators. On October 27, 2021 Batherson scored his first NHL career hat trick on Ilya Samsonov in a 7–5 loss to the Washington Capitals. He was selected to participate in the 2022 NHL All-Star Game. However, after being injured by an unexpected hit from Buffalo Sabres goaltender Aaron Dell on January 26, 2022, he was unable to attend the event. Batherson was replaced by teammate Brady Tkachuk at the All-Star Game. He returned to play on March 26, 2022 versus the Florida Panthers after missing two months and finished the season with 44 points in 46 games.

Personal life
Batherson has strong family ties to the Senators. He is the son of Norm Batherson, a former professional player who once played for the Ottawa organization with the Prince Edward Island Senators and the Thunder Bay Senators. His uncle Dennis Vial played several seasons with Ottawa in the 1990s and was one of the NHL's most frequent fighters over that time.

Though he grew up in Germany and Canada, Batherson was born in Fort Wayne, Indiana while his father played for the Fort Wayne Komets, and thus he possesses dual Canadian/US citizenship. Early on, he honed his hockey skills in Germany, where his father played seven seasons of pro hockey with four different teams after his North American career had ended. He was then raised in New Minas, in the Annapolis Valley region of western Nova Scotia, where the family settled after his father retired from professional hockey in 2006.

Batherson's sister Mae plays defense for the Kingston Ice Wolves of the Provincial Women's Hockey League. In November 2018, she signed with Syracuse University for the 2019–20 season. His great uncle is Canadian Juno Award-nominated musician Matt Minglewood.

Career statistics

Regular season and playoffs

International

Awards and honours

References

External links
 

1998 births
Living people
American men's ice hockey right wingers
Blainville-Boisbriand Armada players
Belleville Senators players
Canadian ice hockey right wingers
Cape Breton Screaming Eagles players
Ice hockey people from Indiana
Ottawa Senators draft picks
Ottawa Senators players